Kade Nathaniel 'Nathan' Cook is an American record producer, multi-instrumentalist, and arranger.

His discography includes production work for Liam Hayes, and The Poison Control Center.

Production credits (As 'Nathan Cook')
{| class="wikitable"
! width="33"|Year
! width="230"|Album
! width="150"|Artist
|-
|align="center" rowspan="1"|2009
||Raccoo-oo-oon
|Raccoo-oo-oon
|-
|align="center" rowspan="1"|2011
|Stranger Ballet
|The Poison Control Center
|-
|align="center" rowspan="1"|2012
|Heart Explosion
|Sam Vicari
|-
|align="center" rowspan="1"|2013
|A Glimpse Inside the Mind of Charles Swan III (Music From the Motion Picture) 
|Liam Hayes
|-
|align="center" rowspan="1"|2014
|Korp Sole Roller 
|Liam Hayes
|-
|align="center" rowspan="1"|2014
|Tomorrow 
|Hushdrops
|-
|align="center" rowspan="1"|2015
|Slurrup 
|Liam Hayes
|-
|}

References

Living people
Date of birth missing (living people)
Record producers from Indiana
American multi-instrumentalists
Musicians from Indianapolis
Year of birth missing (living people)